Jandala is a village in Abbottabad District of Khyber-Pakhtunkhwa province of Pakistan. It is located at 34°1'10N 73°16'20E with an altitude of 1589 metres (5216 feet).

References

Populated places in Abbottabad District